Playing with Fire is a 1975 French-Italian comedy-drama film written and directed by Alain Robbe-Grillet and starring  Jean-Louis Trintignant.

It was released in France in 1975 and recorded admissions of 350,606.

Cast

 Jean-Louis Trintignant: le bel homme / l'homme de main
 Philippe Noiret: le banquier
 Anicée Alvina: Carolina, fille du banquier
 Philippe Ogouz: un homme de main
 Agostina Belli: la femme de chambre
 Sylvia Kristel: une femme enlevée
 Christine Boisson: la première jeune fille enlevée
 Vernon Dobtcheff: un messager
 Serge Marquand: le valet
 Jacques Seiler: le chauffeur du taxi
 Jacques Doniol-Valcroze: le commissaire de police

Production
Luc Béraud is assistant director on the movie.

References

External links

1975 films
Films directed by Alain Robbe-Grillet
French comedy films
Italian comedy films
1970s French-language films
1970s French films
1970s Italian films